The following is a list of characters from the "Fudge" series of novels by Judy Blume.

Hatcher family

Peter Warren "Pete" Hatcher
A smart, impatient, sarcastic, and seemingly naive boy who lives in New York City. He is a kind, polite, thoughtful and sensitive boy, but reveals a quick temper when provoked or impassioned. He often feels unappreciated and uncared for by his parents, mainly due to the amount of attention his brother requires. In the first book, he is nine years old and in the fourth grade, and in Double Fudge he is twelve and in seventh grade. He has a habit of imagining things, often at times thinking up TV ads for concepts he has just been introduced to (a trait likely inherited from his father as that is his career). He likes to collect things, such as baseball cards. Peter tries to make it very clear that he despises his brother, but it is obvious that he truly cares for him. He was originally called "Pee-tah" by Fudge when Fudge was a toddler, which later changed to "Pete" when Fudge improved his speaking with age. Peter despised being called "Pete" by his little brother more than "Pee-Tah", but does his best to put up with it. He is a smart kid and he is a hard worker who cares deeply for his family and friends.

Farley Drexel "Fudge" Hatcher
Fudge is Peter's little brother. Disaster follows him everywhere he goes, often making a spectacle of himself and setting a bad image to his family. Some of his best-known escapades in the series include throwing temper tantrums (most notably at the shoe store), finger-painting with mashed potatoes at a diner, scribbling all over Peter's transportation committee poster, and ultimately, swallowing Peter's small pet turtle. Although Fudge is spoiled, will often throw tantrums, and act very immature, he later becomes very intelligent for his age (as first revealed in Superfudge). Later still, he becomes very imaginative like his brother Peter. Thus, he eventually develops from a spoiled and demanding toddler into a less spoiled and much kinder boy with a vivid imagination and a strong desire to learn things. From book one until book 3, he calls Peter "Pee-tah". In book 4, he decides to call Peter "Pete", much to the dislike of his brother. Fudge will have a meltdown if he is called by his real name of "Farley Drexel", "Farley" or even "Drexel" as shown in the third book; however, in Fudge-a-Mania, he briefly identifies himself as Farley to someone without incident. Also, in Double Fudge, when he becomes obsessed with money, he refers to the bank he'd like to have as the "Farley Drexel Hatcher Bank", which surprises Peter and causes him to realize that Fudge is not a good adult name. He has a pet bird named "Uncle Feather".

Tamara Roxanne "Tootsie" Hatcher
Peter and Fudge's baby sister, born in the second book. Fudge is jealous and hates her in the beginning, even attempting to exchange her for things such as money or a two-wheeled bicycle. Right before the Hatchers move to Princeton Fudge hides her in a closet. Tootsie is rather playful, curious and likable.  Her first word that she ever spoke was "Yuck" when she hears Peter say it when he is changing her diaper. Then she says "Nu Yuck", when the family decides to go back to New York City. She eventually learns more words and likes to repeat what some people say. She especially likes to make animal noises when she hears somebody saying the name of an animal. In the fourth book, Tootsie accidentally walks across Frank Fargo's paintings before they dry, leading Fargo to create a whole series of paintings featuring Tootsie's footprints on canvas, called "Baby Feet". In Double Fudge, when the Fargos move downtown, the Hatchers learn she can't pronounce "sh" yet.

Anne Hatcher
Mother of Peter, Fudge, and later, Tootsie. She is a stay-at-home mom who later becomes a professional dental hygienist. She always does her best to be a mother to her children, although she tends to be more partial towards Fudge. She becomes related to the Tubman family when her mother, Muriel, marries Bertram "Buzzy Senior" Tubman in Maine.

Warren Hatcher 
Warren is father to Peter, Fudge and Tootsie (Peter's middle name comes from his father). He is in the advertising business and he writes commercials. His agency has had accounts with Juicy-O and the Toddle Bike company (for whom Fudge appears in a commercial), as well as with X-Plode Cereal (only mentioned by Fudge, though). In the first book, he is much more of a blunt parent than his wife. When Fudge refuses to eat his meals and wants to be fed like a dog, Warren takes charge and warns Fudge he will either "eat it or wear it" — putting an end to the tomfoolery. In the second book, he takes a leave of absence from the ad agency to attempt to write a book called History Of Advertising but at the end of the second book, he gives it up altogether and returns to his old job in the advertising company. He grows a beard in Superfudge but later shaves it off in Fudge-a-Mania.

Grandma Muriel 
Anne's mother and Peter's maternal grandmother. She is known for using classic phrases and various tricks to help the kids. She originally was a gymnastics teacher, so she is very good at turning cartwheels, and agrees to teach Sheila Tubman how. In the fourth book, she marries Sheila's grandfather, Buzzy Senior, thereby uniting both the Hatcher and Tubman families much to the dismay of Peter Hatcher and Sheila Tubman. She is a very likable, and an agreeable person altogether.

Cousin Howard "Howie" Hatcher
Warren's long-lost cousin in Double Fudge, both of whom were great friends. Howie seems to have some slightly rude behavior, as he calls Warren "Tubby" even though he's lost some weight since, and a rather crazy driver when it comes to golf carts, and easily gets frustrated. Howie works as a park ranger in Hawaii and plans to move his family to the Everglades. According to Peter, Howie says "no" to everything such as pop music, romance series books, TV, junk food, school, fashion magazines with advice to the lovelorn, etc..

Cousin Eudora Hatcher 
Howie's wife in Double Fudge. Like her husband, she calls Warren "Tubby". She also happens to be pregnant, and isn't as rude and strict as her husband, and is often the mediator between Howie and their daughters.

Flora and Fauna Hatcher 
Howie and Eudora's two identical twelve-year-old twin daughters in Double Fudge. They are known for both finishing each other's sentences, and breaking it into song and dance routines in public, which impresses others but embarrasses Peter. They do seem to be somewhat spoiled, and usually beg and plead to get their way, while Eudora manages to present the case carefully to Howie. They are usually nicknamed the "Natural Beauties" (due to Flora meaning plant life and Fauna meaning animal life) and the "Heavenly Hatchers".

"Mini" Farley Drexel Hatcher
Flora and Fauna's younger 3-and-1/2-year-old brother and Howie's and Eudora's son in Double Fudge, who acts similar to Fudge's 2-year-old Tales of a Fourth Grade Nothing behavior in many ways. Usually he will just growl and act like an animal, due to his older sisters trying to always comment on him and act as if he were non-verbal, but all that changed by the end when he finally made the point to the twins he can speak for himself. Fudge grows to dislike him, due to him nearly receiving the same nickname as Fudge, being the cause of Uncle Feather's broken wing, and ultimately swallowing Fudge's first loose tooth at their farewell dinner.
Back to top

Fargo family

Jimmy Fargo
Peter's best friend. He is in the same grade as Peter and slightly older than he is, assuming that he celebrated his tenth birthday in the first book, and taller than Sheila. Jimmy and his family originally lived a few buildings down from Peter and Sheila, and then moved into Peter and Sheila's building, before eventually moving down to SoHo. In the TV series, Jimmy and his father are African-American.

Frank Fargo 
Jimmy's father. He used to be an actor but became an abstract artist, judging from Peter's descriptions of some of his paintings. In Superfudge he and his wife divorced, which was very unsettling for their son. In the third book of the series, Fudge-a-Mania, Tootsie accidentally toddles across one of Frank's paintings, which inspires him for a new artwork series entitled "Baby Feet". Frank gets remarried to Beverly Muldour, an art dealer and neighbor of the Hatchers from their time in Princeton, New Jersey.

Anita Fargo 
Jimmy Fargo's mother and the first wife of Frank Fargo. She is first seen in the first Fudge book at Jimmy's birthday party giving Peter his pet turtle, Dribble. She later divorced Frank Fargo after an argument during which she threw red paint at one of his paintings, to which Mr. Fargo took advantage to display, calling the painting "Anita's Anger". Jimmy said that his mother loves kissing, so she moved from New York to Vermont, where Jimmy and Peter believe people engage in much kissing. Mrs. Fargo appears to have moved to a very rural community in Vermont, as Peter says at one point he is unable to contact Jimmy as he is visiting his mother in Vermont, and they had no telephone service there.
Back to top

Tubman family

Sheila Tubman
Peter's rival (though Peter sees her as a "sworn enemy"). She lives in Peter's apartment building two floors below his own. Peter believes Sheila is a real know-it-all. She was the Queen of Cooties even when she was in 4th grade. She gives up cooties sometime between the fourth and seventh chapters of the first book. She is incredibly bossy, which is especially evidenced when she tries to run a report committee (which Peter and Jimmy were also in) by herself. She has an older sister named Libby. In the second book, she exhibits a fear of dogs, especially Peter's dog, Turtle. There may be some chances of Sheila and Peter showing slight affections towards each other throughout the series, and it is obvious she has a small crush on him. In the fourth book, Sheila becomes Peter's cousin-in-law when her grandfather, Buzzy, and Peter's grandmother, Muriel, marry. In the book Otherwise Known as Sheila the Great, Sheila meets her best friend, Mouse Ellis. She constantly fibs about her fear for many things, such as dogs, spiders, swimming, and the dark, but in the end, she confronts her fears and admits her weak side.

Libby Tubman 
Sheila's older sister, who often is seen dancing in a leotard. She fancies herself as being very sophisticated and glamorous, addressing her parents as "Mother" and "Father". She is very interested in boys, and it is also shown she is not a great singer, when she does not get the part of Wendy in a production of Peter Pan. In the third book, Mrs. Hatcher hires Libby to help watch after Fudge when the demands of a baby and other parenting responsibilities get to be too much for her to handle at once. Her friend, when the Tubman family lived in Tarrytown, is Mary Ann Markman, though Libby didn't seem to like her at first when Mary Ann was given the role of Wendy, they eventually become best friends. Libby is often annoyed by Sheila and her attention-getting, much like Peter could be with Fudge, and so, because of their shared situations, is often willing to try to get along with Peter. In the fourth book, Libby becomes Peter's cousin-in-law when her grandfather Buzzy Senior marries Peter's grandmother. In the fifth book, she does not appear. According to Sheila, Libby went off to college.

Jean and Bertram "Buzz" Tubman 
Sheila and Libby's parents.  Mr. Tubman is a college professor at Marymount College in the second book. In the third book, they become related to the Hatchers when Mr. Tubman's father marries Anne Hatcher's mother.

Buzzy Senior 
Sheila's grandfather, who ends up marrying Muriel at the end of Fudge-a-Mania, thereby uniting the Hatcher and Tubman families, much to Peter's and Sheila's dismay.
Back to top

Ellis family

Merle 'Mouse' Ellis
Sheila's same age friend from Tarrytown in Otherwise Known As Sheila The Great that has many noticeable scabs on her legs. They are best buds until a game of slam book where they start fighting with Bobby Egran's models with the Van Arden twins, Sondra and Jane. Despite it all, Mouse and Sheila repair their friendship afterwards. She is the grand champion of Tarrytown in yo-yo and is an expert swimmer. She was going to visit Sheila in Maine in Fudge-a-Mania, but was struck down with chicken pox and couldn't make it, much to the dismay of Sheila.

Betsy Ellis
Mouse's little sister at age 4 in Otherwise Known As Sheila The Great. She is a champion swimmer known to do perfect dives. She is allergic to dogs and carries around her make-believe dog (which is an empty candy box), whom she calls Ootch. She calls Sheila "Sunny", which was her made-up nickname.
Back to top

Manheim family

Daniel Manheim 
Fudge's new friend, introduced in Superfudge. He is described as adopted, pudgy and Jewish, with much reddish hair, and ears that stick out even more than Peter's. Daniel is a bird expert, as seen in the beginning of Chapter 9 as he is lecturing Fudge on myna birds. He also delivers his tough-guy line: "Ya wanna make somethin' of it?" whenever asked of something. Once, though, after delivering his "tough-guy" line, Elaine, an acquaintance of Peter, agreed to "make something of it" and (playfully) challenged him to fight. Daniel then proceeded to chicken out.

According to himself, he's six years old and lives at 432 Vine Street. He is a fussy eater; he constantly mentions that he does not like onions, lima beans, peas, Oreo cookies or bread crusts, and only drinks chocolate milk. Daniel lives in Princeton in the books, but in the TV series, Daniel lives in New York City (presumably in the same building as the Hatchers) and replaces Ralph in Fudge's group of friends invited to his birthday party. Also in the TV series, Daniel wears glasses and is five years old, but still retains his tough-guy attitude.

Mrs. Manheim
Daniel's adoptive mother in Superfudge, who is heavily concerned about her son. She drives a red sports car.
Back to top

Muldour family

Mrs. Muldour 
One of Peter's new acquaintances in Superfudge. She is an elderly woman who lives near Peter, also is to be believed that she eats worms as Peter and Alex dig them up for her.

Beverly Muldour
A pretty young woman Peter first sees when she is working at an art gallery in Princeton in Superfudge. Due to her plunging neckline Peter secretly refers to her as "Giraffe Neck". It is later revealed that she is the daughter of Mrs. Muldour and is a big fan of Frank Fargo's paintings for their originality. She eventually becomes Frank Fargo's second wife and Jimmy's step-mother.
Back to top

Apfel family

Mitzi Apfel
Friend of Fudge's whom he met on vacation in Maine in Fudge-a-Mania. She is obsessed with Fudge, and develops a crush on him. According to Fudge, she keeps monster spray and has a baby brother called Jacob. She is also the granddaughter of famous baseball player Big Apfel.

Mrs. A
Mitzi's grandmother and Big Apfel's wife in Fudge-A-Mania. She makes Mitzi's monster spray for her and makes really tasty cocoa. Peter and Fudge first meet her when they go round the neighbor's houses asking if the neighbors have seen Uncle Feather. Mrs A originally thinks Uncle Feather is Peter and Fudge's uncle.

Big Apfel
Famous baseball player who Peter is astounded to find is his new neighbor in Maine in Fudge-A-Mania. Peter seriously looks forward to playing a game with him as there is a weekly softball game. However, Peter's enthusiasm is somewhat tempered when Big Apfel says he has aged since his Red Sox days and takes a more relaxed attitude to the community softball game, seeing it more as a friendly get-together as opposed to the Yankee-Red Sox intense rivalry Peter had read stories about. When Peter's grandmother gets married in an outdoor wedding, Big Apfel attends in his Red Sox uniform and barbecues burgers for the guests.
Back to top

Other characters

Mrs. Reese
The Tubmans' next door neighbor in Otherwise Known As Sheila The Great. She has a small puppy named Baby.

Henry Bevelheimer 
The elevator operator, whom seems to know everybody in the apartment. Henry and Peter get along very well. On one occasion (in Superfudge), he scolded Peter for siccing Turtle on Sheila after she and Peter got into an argument. In Double Fudge, he helps out with Uncle Feather's brief period of being unable to talk, and is then later promoted to superintendent of the building (which is also his job in the TV series) and converts the elevator to self-service.

Dr. Cone
The family pediatrician in Tales of a Fourth Grade Nothing, to whom Anne turns for advice when Fudge eats flowers, falls from the jungle gym, and refuses to eat. Despite Dr. Cone's assurances that most of the problems are normal for small children, even that will often fail to sway Anne's fretfulness. He offers reassurance to Peter when Fudge swallows his turtle.

Dr. Brown
The family dentist in Tales of a Fourth Grade Nothing.  He went to school and is personal friends with Warren, who calls him "Dusty". Peter even remarked that Dr. Cone is always saying he "takes special good care of me and Fudge because we're chips off the old block (the old block being my father)". He does not allow fretful parents in the room when he is working on young patients.

Mr. Berman
A children's shoe salesman at Bloomingdale's in Tales of a Fourth Grade Nothing.  He remembers all his regular customers including the Hatcher brothers and entertains them with comic antics and gives out candy.

Jane and Sondra Van Arden
A set of twin sisters that also live in Tarrytown that are friends with Sheila and Mouse in Otherwise Known As Sheila The Great. Sondra is amply contoured, sensitive and shy, is a great swimmer despite her size, and usually comes up with good ideas. Jane is more aggressive than her sister, and is also more rude, and much thinner than Sondra. During their slam book game, Sondra is deeply offended by her friends calling her a "fat slob" and "crybaby", and Jane is equally offended because she got some negative criticism as well.

Ralph, Jennie and Sam
Fudge's original friends who live in the same apartment building in Tales of a Fourth Grade Nothing. In the TV series, Ralph does not appear, but Jennie and Sam do. Jennie and her family are of Chinese descent in the TV series.
 Ralph loves food and is very large-bodied to the point where his own mother cannot lift him. 
 Jennie is described by Peter as a mini-vampire since she likes to bite people. She is also quite rude (which is shown when she annoys Anne Hatcher), and she even urinates on the rug. She also dislikes when she can't have things her way. 
 Sam went through a stage of having nearly every phobia possible, although he got over that by the end of Fudge's third birthday party in Tales of a Fourth Grade Nothing, as evidenced by Peter's remark: "Now that he was used to us, I guess he liked us". He also winds up getting chicken pox (in the seventh chapter of Tales of a Fourth Grade Nothing), and having a new baby sibling (in the first chapter of Superfudge).

Alex Santo
Peter's new friend, introduced in Superfudge, as very small, with hair that hangs into his eyes, and seems to be a fan of Princeton University as he is often seen wearing a T-shirt that says "Princeton, Class of '91". He is a Boy Scout and was away at Scout camp when Peter first moved to Princeton. He collects worms for Mrs. Muldour, an elderly neighbor, and Peter soon joins him in that business.

Joanne McFadden
A girl who sits behind Peter in his sixth grade class and becomes the object of his affection in Superfudge. Peter sits next to her when seeing Superman. During the famous scene of Superman's flying date with Lois Lane, Peter falls victim to ice poured on his back by Fudge (who flees before Peter can retaliate). Joanne handles the situation well, drying off Peter's back, and they hold hands for the rest of the film. When they stand under the mistletoe hung in the classroom, she kisses Peter near his ear, and Peter does the same, except that she turns her head at the last second, with Peter ending up with a mouthful of hair.

Martha and Harvey 
The two class members in Peter's sixth grade class in Superfudge (besides Peter) that aren't native to New Jersey. Harvey is from Pennsylvania, and seems to get along with Peter as they are both "outsiders" in the class. When Peter and his class get assigned a geography report on New Jersey, Martha requests if she could give one instead on her home state of Minnesota. Although Mr. Bogner does not give an answer upfront, he does seem to approve the idea as it would be original for the class.

Sharon and Elaine
Two other girls in Peter's class while he was in Princeton in Superfudge. Sharon is known for looking down at the ground or up at the sky, and Elaine is known for hitting guys her own age in the stomach. Neither Sharon or Elaine's last names are revealed, though. They are friends with Joanne, and also socialize with Peter and Alex. Although Peter and Elaine are the same age, he was never socked in the stomach by her and they got along just fine. It is hinted for Jimmy to possibly develop a crush on Sharon. Elaine is also the only person to agree to take Daniel up on his offer of 'making something of it' (wherein he becomes frightened and pleads with her not to hurt him), but she was only joking.

Melissa Beth Miller
Fudge's new friend that moves into their apartment building in Double Fudge. She is Fudge's age and attends his special mixed group class at school. She has a cat named Fuzzball and dressed up as Hermione Granger for Halloween.

Richie Potter
Fudge's best friend from school in Double Fudge. He is a very wealthy boy with allergies, and likes to brag a lot, usually about what he does in the bathroom. Fudge originally thought he was a cousin of the famous boy wizard Harry Potter (as they have the same last name). When he comes to Fudge’s house, he asks for "lightly steamed florets" as a snack. After he finds out that Fudge does not have those things, he (rather rudely) comments that he didn't know the Hatchers were poor.

Mr. & Mrs. Howard Yarby
The president of the Juicy-O company, who lives in Chicago, Illinois in Tales of a Fourth Grade Nothing. Juicy-O is a mixed-fruit beverage—a combination of orange, pineapple, grapefruit, pear, and banana—which Peter and his dad found noxious-tasting, and was annoyed when Mr. Yarby sent a crate of it to the Hatcher residence after Warren wrote a TV commercial for the company. Peter's father invited the Yarbys to stay with them when they visited New York City, which annoyed Peter as he would have to sleep with Fudge. Mr. & Mrs. Yarby realize that Fudge is rambunctious and remark on inappropriate deportment, irking Peter because he felt he was being respectful to adults. The Yarbys later leave for a hotel after too much of Fudge's toddler escapades, and terminate the business relationship with Warren. However, Warren says it is a blessing in disguise that he lost the account, as Juicy-O was selling poorly in stores, as poorly as the Edsel automobile. When Peter says he lied about liking Juicy-O for the sake of manners, Warren reveals to his son that he himself found the stuff pretty disgusting. Mrs. Yarby is repulsed by reptiles.

Mr. George Vincent
The president of the Toddle Bike company in Tales of a Fourth Grade Nothing. He chooses Fudge to star in the new commercial for his product, but gets furious when Fudge does not act on cue. Mr. Vincent is almost always seen smoking a big cigar.

Janet
Warren's gorgeous secretary in Tales of a Fourth Grade Nothing. She usually carries around a purse stuffed to bursting with Goldfish crackers, Oreos, and beauty supplies. She kisses Peter for convincing Fudge to complete the commercial. Peter secretly feels that her kisses are too wet and he wipes them off.

Mr. Bogner
Peter and Alex's sixth-grade teacher in Princeton in Superfudge. Whereas Peter remarks how some of his past teachers were dumb, he realizes Mr. Bogner is skilled and dedicated to his job, thus Peter learns to respect him.

Mr. Green
The mustached school principal of Peter and Fudge's school in Princeton in Superfudge. On the first day of school, he and Peter go to Fudge's kindergarten class because of Fudge's problems with his teacher, Mrs. Hildebrandt.  During an assembly with author Brian Tumkin illustrating a picture of a person Fudge knows, Fudge chooses Mr. Green, who appreciates the drawing and hangs it in his office.

Mrs. Hildebrandt
Fudge's first kindergarten teacher in Superfudge, who he calls "Rat Face" with which Peter apparently doesn't disagree. According to Fudge, she is mean, wouldn't let him play with the round blocks (she never lets her students play with the round blocks on the first day of school because it's one of her rules), and wouldn't call him Fudge, so he had to kick her and climb on top of the cabinets. After he moves to the other kindergarten, Mrs. Hildebrandt frequently calls him Farley at every opportunity. When he leaves her kindergarten, she says to him "Goodbye, Farley Drexel", and when she meets Uncle Feather she says "What a beautiful bird Farley has". When Fudge tells her that Uncle Feather speaks French, Mrs. Hildebrandt who also speaks French says to him, "Parlez-vous Francais?" Uncle Feather replies, "Bonjour, stupid!" Fudge does not kick her in the TV series.

Ms. Ziff
Fudge's second kindergarten teacher in Superfudge. She is very nice and is reading "An Anteater Named Arthur" when Fudge arrives and he is impressed, since he is a fan of the book.

Brian Tumkin
A famous author in Superfudge whose children's books Fudge likes. In one chapter he gives a lecture at Fudge and Peter's school. When Fudge gets called up to the stage Mr. Tumkin says they will do a game called Chalk Talk in which Fudge dictates characteristics of a person and Mr. Tumkin will draw it out. This scares Peter as Fudge is granted a big chance to embarrass Peter in front of the whole school. However, the person drawn ends up being Mr. Green, who is pleased by the results and asks Brian Tumkin to autograph the drawing so he can hang it in his office.

Bicycle Bob
Bicycle-shop owner who acts as mentor to the children. When Peter accidentally swallows a fly, Bicycle Bob welcomes him to the ISAF club (I Swallowed a Fly) and recommends vanilla ice cream. According to Judy Blume, he is based directly on a real person whom she met one summer when she was growing up, who did indeed own a bike shop.

"When in Rome"
A woman in Fudge-A-Mania who Peter meets and calls "When in Rome" at Big Apfel's baseball game because she had quoted the old "When in Rome" phrase. She also appears at Muriel and Buzzy Senior's wedding, as the Justice of the Peace. She calls Peter "Junior".

Olivia Osterman
An older woman who lives in the same apartment building as the Hatchers in Double Fudge. She was an actress on Broadway, and often gives out boxes of raisins to the kids (as well as dog biscuits for the dogs). However, as Peter observed, she doesn't understand why Peter named his dog Turtle, even though he had explained it to her a million times. She, Mini-Farley and Fudge got trapped in an elevator, and Fudge tells them they are fine, using the codenames Yelraf Rose, Egduf Muriel, and Aivilo Veruschka.
Back to top

Teens

Isobel
Gorgeous teenage library assistant that Peter meets on holiday in Maine in "Fudge-A-Mania", and develops a serious crush on. Her nickname is Izzy. When Fudge asks Peter what's wrong, Peter admits that Isobel makes him feel dizzy. Fudge later tells that to Jimmy and Sheila. Jimmy doesn't share Peter's affection for Isobel, and Peter loses his spark for her when she doesn't pick him for her team at the ball game. Isobel also persuades Fudge to write an autobiography of himself, entitled "Tell Me A Fudge", after he discovers his friend Mitzi has a book about herself, "Tell Me A Mitzi". Fudge, however, only writes the chapter titles. Peter's infatuation with Isobel despite her being older and him having a brief fantasy of being stranded with her on an island while wearing loincloths mirrored the protagonist of another Judy Blume book, Tony Miglione and his crush on Lisa Hoober in Then Again, Maybe I Won't.

Marty
Marty is Sheila's swim teacher in Tarrytown in "Otherwise Known As Sheila The Great". Boy-crazy Libby thinks he's gorgeous. At first he has a bit of trouble working with Sheila due to her fear of water, as well as the classes being in a public pool where she may be seen, and Sheila seems to grow a grudge against him. The friction dissolves when Sheila is upfront with Marty about her aquaphobia, and he develops a system to prepare her for her beginner's test. Shiela ends up getting a perfect score on her test and is glad to have gotten a beginner's card. When the Tubmans leave, they have an end-of-summer party, and Marty gets invited. Because she saw him all this time in swim trunks, she at first does not recognize him being fully dressed on dry land.

Freddie 
A seventeen-year-old lifeguard at the Tarrytown community pool in Otherwise Known As Sheila The Great, and yet another young gentleman Libby Tubman finds appealing. She hangs around his guard stand every day, flirts with him and brings him beverages. Upon learning he has a girlfriend, however, she ignores him and sticks to friends and company in her own age group.

Denise
A counselor at the day camp where Sheila and Libby attend in Tarrytown, who teaches pottery. She is also seen accompanying the kids on a haunted hayride where they learn about the fabled Sleepy Hollow and Ichabod Crane.

Allen & Paul
Two teenagers at the day camp Sheila attends. When Sheila runs a camp newspaper that proves too much for her, she forgot she did a crossword with a prize. Paul and Allen approach her showing they solved the crossword and asking what their prize is, and she awards them editorship of the newspaper. The two seem to do a better job at managing the paper, which Sheila is relieved by.
Back to top

Pets

Dribble
Peter's first pet that he won at his best friend Jimmy Fargo's birthday party. Peter always looked after him, but Fudge was always finding ways to harm Dribble, and in the end finally swallowed him. Despite having been successfully extracted from Fudge's stomach after he was given a combination of prune juice, castor oil and milk of magnesia, the turtle died of an unknown cause (though possibly due to being unable to survive the conditions of being in a human stomach), which Peter's doctor predicted would happen. Peter refuses to accept that, and is thus despondent when Dribble is killed. In the book Tales of a Fourth Grade Nothing it seems that no one seems to make a big deal of Dribble's death, but in the TV series episode, his grandmother gently explains what happened, and his parents show more affection, while also apologizing for helping to cause it.

Turtle
Peter's pet dog, named in memory of Dribble. Peter received him after Fudge swallowed his first pet. He is feared and hated by Sheila Tubman due to her having a fear of large dogs. In the TV series, Turtle is a Saint Bernard.

Mumford
A male dog who sires Jennifer's puppies, one of whom is Sheila's dog Jake.

Uncle Feather
Fudge's Myna bird. They got it when Fudge wanted a bird for a pet in Superfudge. His parents want him to get something else, like a canary or parakeet, but Peter suggests a myna bird, which he mentions can talk, much to everyone else's regret. Fudge wants one so he gets Uncle Feather, whose favorite thing to say is "Bonjour, stupid". In Double Fudge, Turtle likes to "sing" with him to Fudge's theme song about money. Later in the book, he goes "on strike", according to Henry, and will not talk at all, but all that changes when he has a near-death incident (thanks to Mini-Farley), which causes him to start talking again. In the books, the family got Uncle Feather when they were living in Princeton, NJ, back in Superfudge.

Baby
A small dog belonging to neighbor Mrs. Reese in Otherwise Known As Sheila The Great.

Vinny
A Yorkie belonging to Jimmy's stepmother Beverly in Double Fudge.

Jake
A small white and brown puppy belonging to Sheila and Libby. In Otherwise Known as Sheila the Great, the Tubman family visit Tarrytown and care for a dog named Jennifer. Jennifer mates with another dog, Mumford, and have a litter of puppies. Sheila and Libby are allowed to have one of the puppies, and later named her Jake. As Shelia isn't afraid of Jake like she is Turtle, it's hinted and eventually revealed that she isn't afraid of small dogs and big "disgusting" dogs like Turtle are the ones that make her uncomfortable.
Back to top

References

External links

Fudge series
Fudge